Aram Egiazaryan (born 10 October 1982), better known by his stage name Arame is an Armenian pop singer. In 2017, he was awarded with the title of Honored Artist of Armenia by then-President Serzh Sargsyan. Arame was also named the best singer of the year twice in 2007 and 2010.

Discography
 Anzhayn (2007)
 Yaris Boye (2008)
 Mi Kich Ser (2009)
 Im Kyanqi 27-rt Aravot (2010)
 Im Miak Sirelis (2011)
 Qavor (2014)
 10 Tari Miasin (2016)

Filmography

References

External links
Arame's biography

1982 births
Living people
21st-century Armenian male singers
Armenian pop singers
Armenian folk-pop singers
Armenian Apostolic Christians